A by-election was held for the Australian House of Representatives seat of Scullin in Victoria (Australia) on 8 February 1986. This was triggered by the resignation of Labor Party MP and Speaker Harry Jenkins to become Australian Ambassador to Spain.

Scullin had always been a very safe Labor seat, and the election was won easily by Labor candidate Harry Jenkins (the former member's son), despite a swing to the Liberal Party.

Candidates

Liberal Party of Australia – Domenic Cichello.
Australian Democrats – Joseph Privitelli.
Democratic Labor Party – John Mulholland. Mulholland had previously contested three federal elections and one by-election for the DLP.
Australian Labor Party – Harry Jenkins, a public servant, son of the retiring member Harry Jenkins.
Socialist Workers Party – Maurice Sibelle.

Results

See also
 List of Australian federal by-elections

References

1986 elections in Australia
Victorian federal by-elections
1980s in Victoria (Australia)